Jonathan Campbell (born 17 July 1987) is an English rugby league footballer who plays on the  or as a  for the Batley Bulldogs in the Betfred Championship.

He has previously played for Batley and the Bradford Bulls in the Championship. Campbell has also spent time on loan from Bradford at the Keighley Cougars in League 1.

Rugby league career
Campbell played for Batley for six years.

Bradford
Campbell signed a two-year deal with the Bradford Bulls following the 2015 season. Campbell played in three matches during the 2016 season, scoring a try against Oldham.  Following Bradford's liquidation at the end of the 2016 season, Campbell resigned with the reformed club.
In 2017, he featured in the pre-season friendlies against Huddersfield and Keighley.  Campbell played in Round 5 against the London Broncos to Round 15 Hull Kingston Rovers then in Round 18 against the Rochdale Hornets. He featured in Round 22 Batley to Round 23 Swinton. Campbell played in the Championship Shield Game 3 against Swinton. Campbell also played in the 2017 Challenge Cup in Round 4 against the Featherstone Rovers.

Batley
In September 2017, Campbell signed to play with Batley in the 2018 season.
On 30 July 2022, Campbell scored four tries for Batley in a 60-6 victory over Dewsbury.

References

External links
Johnny Campbell Batley profile

1987 births
Living people
Batley Bulldogs players
Bradford Bulls players
English rugby league players
Keighley Cougars players
Rugby league wingers